The 1957–58 Northern Football League season was the 60th in the history of the Northern Football League, a football competition in Northern England.

Clubs

The league featured 14 clubs which competed in the last season, no new clubs joined the league this season.

League table

References

1957-58
4